Vadim Hranovschi (born 14 February 1983 in Camenca) is a Moldovan discus thrower. His personal best throw is 64.43 metres, achieved in May 2010 in Chisinau.

He finished eighth at the 2005 Summer Universiade. He also competed at the Olympic Games in 2004 and 2008, but failed to qualify for the final round.

Competition record

References

1983 births
Living people
Moldovan male discus throwers
Athletes (track and field) at the 2004 Summer Olympics
Athletes (track and field) at the 2008 Summer Olympics
Olympic athletes of Moldova